Braddan Bridge (Irish: Naomh Breandán, Saint Brendan of Clonfert, the Navigator or the Voyager) is a bridge over the river Dhoo on the Douglas to Peel road, from which a halt on the Isle of Man Railway's first line to Peel took its name.

It is a landmark on the Isle of Man TT road-race course, situated in countryside close to the outskirts of Douglas town where motorcycles slow to negotiate a left-right 'S' bend over the river. A traditional viewing spot with seating, in common with other vantage points around the local Douglas area, it is within walking distance of the Ferry Terminal where sea ferries from England, Scotland and Ireland traditionally disembarked day-trip or longer-stay passengers.

Bridge and TT races

The bridge is on the boundary between the parishes of Braddan and Onchan. It is situated between the 1st and 2nd Milestone road-side markers on the Snaefell Mountain Course used for the Isle of Man TT and Manx Grand Prix races, on the junction of the primary A1 Douglas to Peel road and the A23. The stretch of former railway line from the Braddan Bridge halt to Quarterbridge forms part of an access road which allows motor traffic to pass between the inside and outside of the race course when the main road is closed for the races.

Railway halt

Usage
Braddan Halt saw infrequent use, mostly in connection with the open air church services that took place at the nearby Kirk Braddan for many years, for which special train services were operated.

Royalty
In 1963 the Queen Mother travelled from Douglas to here to attend one of the church services in the Royal Coach F.36 which is now in preservation in the Port Erin railway museum at the line's southern terminus.

Re-use
Long after the railway had closed (the last trains ran in September 1968), the station's booking office and waiting shelter remained extant. However, in 1991 the building was removed, refurbished and now resides at the operational station of Colby on the south line.

Today
Upon removal the original shelter was replaced by a modern version in 1989, which itself has since been removed. There is now no evidence that the railway passed through here except for a section of rail used as fence posted on the Western side of the bridge.

Route

See also
Isle of Man Railway stations

References

 Isle of Man Steam Railway Supporters' Association

External links
 

Roads in the Isle of Man
Railway stations opened in 1881
Railway stations closed in 1968
1881 establishments in the British Empire